Guanylate binding protein 5 is a protein in humans that is encoded by the GBP5 gene.

See also 
 Guanylate, conjugate base of guanosine monophosphate
 Guanylate-binding protein

References

Further reading 

Genes on human chromosome 1